Deivaseyalpuram is located in the Tirunelveli-Thoothukudi on National Highway 7A in India. There Sri Rajarajeswari temple is located in the village. It is just app. 26 km from Tirunelveli near Vallanadu which has a Vallanadu Wildlife Sanctuary a protected area of Tamil Nadu created for the protection of Blackbuck Antelope.

Villages in Tirunelveli district